The Battle of Chantonnay (5 September 1793) saw Royalist and Republican French forces clash at Chantonnay during the War in the Vendée. In the wake of his victory at Luçon, Augustin Tuncq sent 7,000 Republican troops under René François Lecomte to occupy an exposed position at Chantonnay. Reacting to the threat, 25,000 Vendeans rebels with 21 cannons led by Maurice d'Elbée and Charles de Bonchamps attacked and crushed the Republicans in a four-hour struggle in which François Séverin Marceau-Desgraviers distinguished himself. Only 2,500 out of 7,500 Republicans escaped the disaster.

References

Battles involving France
Conflicts in 1793
Battles of the War in the Vendée
Battles in Pays de la Loire
History of Vendée
1793 in France